Maptitude is a mapping software program created by Caliper Corporation that allows users to view, edit and integrate maps. The software and technology are designed to facilitate the geographical visualization and analysis of either included data or custom external data.

Maptitude is intended for business users but competes at all levels of the GIS market in many different sectors. It encapsulates the core GIS functionality of the Caliper mapping software suite of products, and integrates with Microsoft Office, data mapping from various sources including Microsoft Excel, and includes a proprietary BASIC-like programming language (Caliper Script) within a development interface (GISDK) that allows automation of the Maptitude environment.

Maptitude geocodes addresses and maintains the geocode precision (the method used to locate the address) in a column in the attribute table. Maptitude provides route planning tools for route optimization that provide route directions for optimal routes for travel and deliveries. Maptitude calculates the distance and the direction of single or multiple routes. Routes are optimized based on the shortest route, fastest route, ordered route, or other route types based on costs other than time or distance.

The Caliper technology is used in the following end-user desktop software:

 Maptitude (for international users, with primary markets in, and tailored add-ons for, the United States, United Kingdom, Canada, Australia, and Brazil; with additional versions for Argentina, Chile, Colombia, France, Germany, India, Ireland, Italy, Mexico, Netherlands, New Zealand, Spain, and South Africa) 
 Maptitude for Redistricting (for redistricting professionals) 
 Maptitude for Precinct and Election Management (for county and state election offices) 
 Political Maptitude (for political campaign strategists) [Discontinued in 2008] 
 TransCAD (for transportation professionals) 
 TransModeler (for traffic simulation)

Caliper technology is also used in the following web-based software:

 Maptitude for the Web 
 TransCAD for the Web

The Web development platform uses application source code that can be edited using JavaScript, HTML, and ASP.NET. Application templates (Mapplications) are used to create a web application or service. The default templates include Ajax applications and mashups that use Google Maps via the Google Maps API.

Product history
The standard Maptitude product is typically released every year as both an upgrade and as a fully packaged product; the current version is Maptitude 2020. Maptitude, which was first released as Maptitude 3.0 in 1995, and numbered to agree with TransCAD 3.0, the first Microsoft Windows version of that software. The Community 2020 edition was released in 1997, a product developed for the U.S. Dept. of Housing and Urban Development (HUD). Maptitude 4.0 was released later that same year (1997) and subsequent versions included 2000 U.S. Census data and additional capabilities. Version 5.0, was released on January 29, 2008. The MAF/TIGER Partnership Software (MTPS) edition was released in 2008, a product developed for the U.S. Census Bureau. Version 6.0, was released in early 2011.

Maptitude 2012, Maptitude 2013, and Maptitude 2014 included updated maps, data, demographics, and features. For example, for the USA, the 2010 US Census Data, ACS demographics, and Nokia HERE Map data were all refreshed. Maptitude 2014 focused on improvements to output, with the inclusion of 3-D maps, reports, and live tiled imagery.

 Maptitude 3.0 (1995), initial release as a commercial product 
 Community 2020 (1997), for the U.S. Department of Housing and Urban Development
 Maptitude 4.0 (1997), significantly updated features 
 Maptitude 4.1 (1999), the first version with 2000 US Census Data 
 Maptitude 4.2 (2000), the first version to include the GISDK rather than offer it as an option 
 Maptitude 4.5 (2001), updated features
 Maptitude 4.6 (2003), very similar to 4.5; more of a Census data update
 Maptitude 4.7 (2004), new features and data
 Maptitude 4.8 (2006), the first version to support aerial photo downloads
 Maptitude 5.0 (2008), major release
 MTPS (2008), for the U.S. Census Bureau  
 Maptitude 6.0 (2011), first version to include commercial grade street data
 Maptitude 2012 (2012), updated software, data, and demographics. Features provide improved drive-time and routing capabilities.
 Maptitude 2013 (2013), updated software, data, and demographics. Features provide further international capabilities. First 64-bit version.
 Maptitude 2014 (2014), updated software, data, and demographics. Features provide improved output.
 Maptitude 2015 (2015), updated software, data, and demographics. Features provide improved reporting.
 Maptitude 2016 (2016), updated software, data, and demographics. Features provide tools targeted at usability and the discontinued Microsoft MapPoint audience.
 Maptitude 2017 (2017), updated software, data, and demographics. Redesigned menus and buttons to streamline the map-making process. Features provide tools for logistics/operations and the discontinued Microsoft MapPoint audience.
 Maptitude 2018 (2018), updated software, data, and demographics. Tools allow updating and linking of data from applications such as Excel. A site selection/facility location-allocation tool was also added
 Maptitude 2019 (2019), updated software, data, and demographics. File management changed from a layer model to a document model.
 Maptitude 2020 (2020), updated software, data, and demographics. Performance improvements.
 Maptitude 2021 (2021), updated software, data, and demographics. Online publishing and sharing added.
 Maptitude 2022 (2022), updated software, data, and demographics that include 2020 Census statistics. Vehicle Routing Problem functionality added.

New versions have sometimes been released before the equivalent TransCAD releases, and have been identically numbered, but recent versions have always followed the release date of the TransCAD software. Maptitude 2012 represented a shift in the version numbering, from a sequential release value to a year number.

The software is available for Microsoft Windows.

See also
 TransModeler Traffic simulation mapping software
 Caliper Corporation

References

External links
 Maptitude Mapping Software - official website

GIS software